Ernst Kaufmann (9 June 1895 – 20 December 1943) was a Swiss racing cyclist. He was the Swiss National Road Race champion in 1917 and 1918.

References

External links
 

1895 births
1943 deaths
People from Baden District, Aargau
Swiss male cyclists
Sportspeople from Aargau